Richard Muther may refer to:

Richard Muther (art historian) (1860–1909), German critic and historian of art
Richard Muther (industrial engineer) (1913–2014), American consulting engineer
Rick Muther (1935–1995), racecar driver